Louis Alphonse Maureau (c 1830 – c 1883) born in New Orleans, was a Franco-American Impressionist painter.

Biography 
Louis-Alphonse Maureau was born in New Orleans, United States. Maureau, according to Edgar Degas' recommendation, participated in the Third Exhibition of Impressionists in 1877.

In 1881, Alphonse Maureau exhibited at the Hôtel Drouot.

References and sources

External links
 Benezit Dictionary of Artists, 2006, site Oxford Index (subscription or library membership required)
 Société des amis des arts de Pau (1878). Livret du salon 1878. Explication des ouvrages de peinture, dessin, gravure et sculpture des artistes vivants, exposés dans les salons de la société au musée de la ville le 18 janvier 1878.  Bibliothèque nationale de France  
  Lévêque, J.-J. (1990). Les années impressionnistes. Troisième exposition impressionniste. 
 Portail des collections des musées de France. Expositions impressionnistes, 1877 (culture.gouv.fr) 
 Société des amis des arts de Nancy (1878). Exposition de 1878 de 25 mai au 15 juillet dans la grande salle de l'université. Catalogue des ouvrages de peinture, sculpture, gravure et lithographie d'artistes vivants, p.71 website Bibliothèque nationale de France 
 Art Institute Chicago
 Degas (exposition), p.216 
 ULAN:500046264

19th-century American painters
American male painters
American Impressionist painters
19th-century French painters
French male painters
French Impressionist painters
Year of birth uncertain
Artists from New Orleans
20th-century American painters
1830 births
1883 deaths
19th-century American male artists
19th-century French male artists
20th-century American male artists